The Whatley Historic District is a historic district in the community of Whatley, Alabama. Whatley was founded with the establishment of a railroad depot in 1887, along the then-newly constructed railroad between Mobile and Selma. It was incorporated as a town in 1901. The historic district features examples of Craftsman, Queen Anne, and regional vernacular architecture. It is a part of the Clarke County Multiple Property Submission and was placed on the National Register of Historic Places on April 30, 1998.

References

National Register of Historic Places in Clarke County, Alabama
Historic districts in Clarke County, Alabama
American Craftsman architecture in Alabama
Queen Anne architecture in Alabama
Historic districts on the National Register of Historic Places in Alabama